Eustathius I may refer to:

 Eustathius of Antioch, Patriarch in 324–337 or 360
 Patriarch Eustatius of Alexandria, Greek Patriarch of Alexandria in 813–817
 Eustathius of Constantinople, Ecumenical Patriarch in 1019–1025
 Jevstatije I, Serbian Archbishop in 1279–1286